Events from the year 1614 in art.

Events
Giovan Battista Crespi begins work on the Sancarlone.

Works

Artemisia Gentileschi - Judith and her Maidservant (1613–14)
Marcus Gheeraerts the Younger - Tom Durie, Anne of Denmark's fool
El Greco
The Adoration of the Shepherds (1612–14)
The Opening of the Fifth Seal (1608–1614)
Abraham Janssens - Peace and Plenty binding Arrows of War
Peter Paul Rubens
The Descent from the Cross
Lamentation of Christ
St Sebastian
Venus Frigida
Hendrick Cornelisz Vroom - Skirmish between Amsterdam and English warships, 20 April 1605
Adam Willaerts - Shipwreck off a Rocky Coast

Births
March 25 - Juan Carreño de Miranda, Spanish painter (died 1685)
April 18 - Nicolas Robert, French miniaturist and engraver (died 1685)
May 12 - Giovanni Bernardo Carboni, Italian historical and portrait painter (died 1683)
July 23 - Bonaventura Peeters, Flemish Baroque painter (died 1652)
August 3 - Juan de Arellano, Spanish painter (born 1614)
date unknown - Jacob van Loo, Dutch painter, founder of the Van Loo family of painters (died 1670)
probable
Pietro Paolo Baldini, Italian painter (died 1684)
Thomas Blanchet, French painter, draughtsman, architect, sculptor and printmaker (died 1689)
Frederik Bloemaert, Dutch engraver (died 1690)
Ambrosio Martínez Bustos, Spanish Baroque painter active in Granada (died 1672)
Johannes Mytens, Dutch painter (died 1670)
Jan van Aken, Dutch Golden Age painter and engraver (died 1661)

Deaths
April 7 - El Greco, Spanish painter (born 1541)
August 11 - Lavinia Fontana, Italian painter (born 1552)
October 2 - Carlo Sellitto, Italian Caravaggisto (born 1581)
October 14 - Jacob Bunel, French painter (born 1568)
date unknown
Cesare Arbasia, Italian Mannerist painter
Ciriaco Mattei, Italian art collector
Konoe Nobutada, Momoyama period Japanese poet, calligrapher, painter and diarist (born 1565)
Paulus van Vianen, Dutch medallist and sculptor (born 1570)
probable - Ambroise Dubois, Flemish painter of the second School of Fontainebleau (born 1542)

 
Years of the 17th century in art
1610s in art